Propazepine is a tricyclic antidepressant (TCA).  Propazepine is sometimes confused with imipramine, which has the central ring nitrogen in a different location. Prazepine is the International nonproprietary name of this compound.  Prazepine is also reported to be one of the many synonyms of imipramine. Propazepine can be synthesized chemically.  Propazepine appears to never have actually been used as a tricyclic antidepressant outside of initial medical tests; therefore, there is little information about it.

References

Further reading 
 
 
 
 
 
 
 

Dimethylamino compounds
Tricyclic antidepressants